The Atba-i-Malak Badar are a branch of Atba-i-Malak Mustaali Ismaili Shi'a Islam. They follow the preachings of both Abdul Hussain Jivaji and Badruddin Ghulam Hussain Miya Khan Saheb. The current leader or Dai al Mutlaq is Maulana Amiruddin Malak Saheb. The Atba-i-Malak Badar community is based in Mahdibagh, Nagpur in India. The Mahdibagh Atba-i-Malak Badar community, is a unique community of peaceful and progressive Muslims, an elitist sect, known as Atba-e-Malak Badar (followers of Maulana Malak and Maulana Badar) named after the two founders of the religious order who founded it in 1891 AD in Nagpur, India. The community, with around 250 members in Nagpur, also has its presence in Ujjain, Vishakhapatnam and Hyderabad with a few families settled in these cities.

History of the Imāmī-Atba-ī-Malak Badar 

{| class="" style="float:center; margin: 2ex 0 0.6em 0.5em; width: 8em; line-height:111%;" 
!The schematic history of the development of the Imāmī-Mustā‘līan Atba-ī-Malak Badar from other Shī‘ah Muslim sects
|-    
|

References 

Tayyibi Isma'ili branches